Baška may refer to places:

Baška, Croatia, a municipality in Croatia
Baška (Frýdek-Místek District), a municipality in the Czech Republic
Baška, Košice-okolie District, a municipality in Slovakia

See also
Baska (disambiguation)